Louie John Patrick Shaw (born 4 January 1999) is an English first-class cricketer.

Shaw was born at Bristol, where he was educated at Clifton College before going up to Oxford Brookes University. While studying at Oxford Brookes, he made two appearances in first-class cricket for Oxford MCCU in 2019, playing against Middlesex and Hampshire. A product of the Somerset academy, he has represented Somerset across various age groups and in early 2017 he toured India with the England under-19 cricket team, playing a single Youth One Day International against the India national under-19 cricket team at Mumbai.

Notes and references

External links

1999 births
Living people
Cricketers from Bristol
People educated at Clifton College
Alumni of Oxford Brookes University
English cricketers
Oxford MCCU cricketers